Andreyevo is the name of several rural localities in Russia.

Modern localities
Andreyevo, Ivanovo Oblast, a village in Ivanovsky District of Ivanovo Oblast
Andreyevo, Kaluga Oblast, a village in Tarussky District of Kaluga Oblast
Andreyevo, Kirov Oblast, a village in Bezvodninsky Rural Okrug of Pizhansky District in Kirov Oblast; 
Andreyevo, Kostroma Oblast, a village in Pokrovskoye Settlement of Oktyabrsky District in Kostroma Oblast; 
Andreyevo (settlement), Leningrad Oblast, a settlement at the railway station in Glazhevskoye Settlement Municipal Formation of Kirishsky District in Leningrad Oblast; 
Andreyevo (village), Leningrad Oblast, a village in Glazhevskoye Settlement Municipal Formation of Kirishsky District in Leningrad Oblast; 
Andreyevo, Moscow Oblast, a village in Averkiyevskoye Rural Settlement of Pavlovo-Posadsky District in Moscow Oblast; 
Andreyevo, Chkalovsky District, Nizhny Novgorod Oblast, a village in Purekhovsky Selsoviet of Chkalovsky District in Nizhny Novgorod Oblast; 
Andreyevo, Varnavinsky District, Nizhny Novgorod Oblast, a village in Bogorodsky Selsoviet of Varnavinsky District in Nizhny Novgorod Oblast; 
Andreyevo, Kishertsky District, Perm Krai, a selo in Kishertsky District of Perm Krai
Andreyevo, Sivinsky District, Perm Krai, a village in Sivinsky District of Perm Krai
Andreyevo, Demidovsky District, Smolensk Oblast, a village in Poluyanovskoye Rural Settlement of Demidovsky District in Smolensk Oblast
Andreyevo, Smolensky District, Smolensk Oblast, a village in Kasplyanskoye Rural Settlement of Smolensky District in Smolensk Oblast
Andreyevo, Tver Oblast, a village in Maslovskoye Rural Settlement of Torzhoksky District in Tver Oblast
Andreyevo, Vladimir Oblast, a settlement in Sudogodsky District of Vladimir Oblast
Andreyevo, Vologda Oblast, a village in Talitsky Selsoviet of Kirillovsky District in Vologda Oblast
Andreyevo, Yaroslavl Oblast, a village in Bolsheselsky Rural Okrug of Bolsheselsky District in Yaroslavl Oblast

Alternative names
Andreyevo, alternative name of Endirey, a selo in Khasavyurtovsky District of the Republic of Dagestan;

See also
Andreyev